Hoxhaj is an Albanian surname. Its literal meaning is "son of the (or little) hodja", which is similar to that of the Bosnian surname Hodžić and the Turkish family name Hocaoğlu. Notable people with the name include:
 Ardit Hoxhaj (born 1994), Albanian footballer
 Enver Hoxhaj (born 1969), Kosovan academic
 Nertil Hoxhaj (born 1997), Albanian footballer
 Petrit Hoxhaj (born 1990), Dutch footballer

References

Albanian-language surnames
Patronymic surnames